Aliiglaciecola aliphaticivorans is a Gram-negative, aerobic, heterotrophic and motile from the genus of Aliiglaciecola with a single polar flagellum which has been isolated from tidal flat from the Yellow Sea in Korea. Aliiglaciecola aliphaticivorans uses aliphatic hydrocarbons as a sole source of carbon.

References

Alteromonadales
Bacteria described in 2015